Lia Rousset (born October 5, 1977 in Alhambra, California) is an American sprint canoer who competed in the mid-1990s. At the 1996 Summer Olympics in Atlanta, she was eliminated in the semifinals of both the K-2 500 m and the K-4 500 m events.

References
 Sports-Reference.com profile

1977 births
American female canoeists
Canoeists at the 1996 Summer Olympics
Living people
Olympic canoeists of the United States
Sportspeople from Alhambra, California
21st-century American women